Bhangura Jarina Rahim Girls High School is a secondary school located at the western corner of Bhangura, Bangladesh. It was established in 1972 by social workers in Bhangura. It is the largest female education institution in Bhangura Upazila and currently has more than 2,000 students and around 60 teachers and other staff members.

Schools in Pabna District
1972 establishments in Bangladesh